Ijames is a surname. Notable people with the surname include:

Claire Lillian Ijames (1889-after January 1932), American comedian and dancer better known as Florence Tempest
 Dwayne Ijames (born 1983), American football player
James Ijames, American performer and playwright

See also
Ijams